is a female Japanese voice actress from Meguro, Tokyo affiliated with Mausu Promotion.

Roles

Television animation
Fighting Beauty Wulong Rebirth (Sachi)
Ouran High School Host Club (Azusa Suwaki, Hina Usami)
Recess (Japanese Dub) (Ashley Armbruster)

Video games
Crash Boom Bang! (Coco Bandicoot)
Izuna Legend of the Unemployed Ninja (Suiren, Tsubaki)

Drama CDs
Mix Mix Chocolate (Schoolgirl 3)

External links
 
Mausu Promotion

1979 births
Japanese voice actresses
Living people
People from Meguro
Voice actresses from Tokyo
20th-century Japanese actresses
21st-century Japanese actresses
Mausu Promotion voice actors